Aloysius Matthew Ambrozic (born Alojzij Matej Ambrožič; January 27, 1930 – August 26, 2011) was a Roman Catholic cardinal and Archbishop of Toronto.  He was made a cardinal on 21 February 1998.

Biography
Ambrozic was born near Gabrje in the Kingdom of Yugoslavia (modern-day Slovenia) as Alojzij Matej Ambrožič, one of seven children of Alojzij (or "Lojze") Ambrožič and Helena Pečar. In May 1945, he and his family fled to Austria, after which he completed high school in Ljubljana and various refugee camps (Vetrinj, Peggez and Spittal an der Drau). The family went to Canada in September 1948, where he studied at St. Augustine's Seminary and was ordained a priest in Toronto on 4 June 1955. He served first in Port Colborne, Ontario, and later taught at St. Augustine's Seminary in Toronto.

He studied theology in Rome, and he earned a degree in theology from the Angelicum. On his return to Canada, he taught Scripture at St Augustine's Seminary from 1960 to 1967.  He then studied at the University of Würzburg in Germany and obtained a doctorate in theology there in 1970. He taught exegesis at the Toronto School of Theology from 1970 to 1976, when he was named Auxiliary Bishop of Toronto on 27 May 1976. On 22 May 1986, he became Coadjutor Archbishop of Toronto, and he duly succeeded to the position of Archbishop of Toronto on 17 March 1990.

In 1998, he was created cardinal by Pope John Paul II and assigned the titular church of Santi Marcellino e Pietro. He became a member of the Pontifical Council for the Pastoral Care of Migrants and Itinerants in 1990, the Congregation for the Clergy in 1991, the Pontifical Council for Culture in 1993, and the Congregation for Divine Worship and the Discipline of the Sacraments in 1999. He was one of the cardinal electors who participated in the 2005 papal conclave that selected Pope Benedict XVI. He retired on 16 December 2006.

During his archiepiscopate, Toronto hosted World Youth Day in 2002. He was a vocal opponent of same-sex marriage in Canada. On his retirement for reasons of age, he was succeeded as Archbishop of Toronto by Thomas Christopher Collins on 30 January 2007.

Ambrozic died on 26 August 2011 after a lengthy illness. His funeral Mass was held on 31 August 2011 at Saint Michael's Cathedral in Toronto, with Archbishop Thomas Collins presiding. More than 1000 people attended the Mass, including Canadian federal finance minister Jim Flaherty and local mayors Rob Ford of Toronto and Hazel McCallion of Mississauga.

Views
Ambrozic was a somewhat contentious figure in Canadian Catholicism, and he was the subject of vocal opposition from some liberal or progressive Catholics and ex-Catholics for his conservative stands. At the same time, he rejected a request from the Toronto Traditional Mass Society (the local chapter of Una Voce) to invite the Priestly Fraternity of St. Peter to offer Tridentine Masses in the archdiocese.

References

External links 
 Cardinal Ambrozic from the Archdiocese of Toronto
 Cardinal Ambrozic on catholic-pages.com

1930 births
2011 deaths
Roman Catholic archbishops of Toronto
Almo Collegio Capranica alumni
Canadian cardinals
Yugoslav emigrants to Canada
Canadian people of Slovenian descent
Cardinals created by Pope John Paul II
Pontifical University of Saint Thomas Aquinas alumni
21st-century Roman Catholic archbishops in Canada
Canadian expatriates in Italy
20th-century Roman Catholic archbishops in Canada